Greg Watanabe (born November 8, 1967) is an American actor known for his role in Watch Over Me. He also appears in the independent films, Philip Kan Gotanda's Life Tastes Good, Only the Brave and Americanese. He is a founding member of the Asian American sketch comedy troupe, 18 Mighty Mountain Warriors. Watanabe received a 2009 Los Angeles Drama Critics Circle Award nomination for Featured Performance in The Happy Ones at South Coast Repertory. In 2010, he appeared in the world premiere of Ken Narasaki's No-No Boy. In October 2015, Watanabe made his Broadway debut in Allegiance: A New American Musical at the Longacre Theatre in New York City with co-stars George Takei, Lea Salonga, Michael K. Lee and Telly Leung.

Filmography

Film

Television

Awards and nominations
Ovation Awards
2011: Nominated for Featured Actor in a Play for the role of Sopoan in the Geffen Playhouse production of "Extraordinary Chambers"

References

External links

Greg Watanabe on MySpace

1967 births
Living people
American male actors of Japanese descent
American male television actors
20th-century American male actors
Place of birth missing (living people)
21st-century American male actors
American male film actors
American film actors of Asian descent